WTFM (98.5 FM), – branded as  98.5 WTFM - is an adult contemporary music formatted radio station licensed to Kingsport, Tennessee, United States, it serves the Tri-Cities area. The station is owned by Glenwood Communications Corporation, through subsidiary Holston Valley Broadcasting Corporation.

History
This station once broadcast as WKPT-FM.  The Federal Communications Commission assigned the WTFM call letters on September 6, 1982.

In January 1986, WTFM changed its format to soft adult contemporary.  Its official slogans include "Better Music for a Better Workday" and "Your Official Listen At Work Station".

References

External links
WTFM official website
Holston Valley Broadcasting Corporation

TFM
Mainstream adult contemporary radio stations in the United States
Radio stations established in 1948
1948 establishments in Tennessee